Eight Miles High is an album by Dutch rock band Golden Earring, released in 1969. It was the first album released under the slightly shorter name Golden Earring (formerly Golden Earrings) and the only album with drummer Sieb Warner.

Track listing
All songs written by Kooymans except where noted.

"Landing" (Gerritsen) – 4:27
"Song of a Devil's Servant" – 6:00
"One Huge Road" – 3:05
"Everyday's Torture" – 5:19
"Eight Miles High" (Gene Clark, David Crosby, Roger McGuinn) – 19:00

Personnel
Barry Hay – flute, rhythm guitar, vocals; lead vocals (tracks 1, 2, 4)
George Kooymans – lead guitar, vocals; lead vocals  (tracks 3, 5)
Rinus Gerritsen – bass, organ, piano
Sieb Warner – drums, percussion

References

Golden Earring albums
1969 albums
Polydor Records albums
Atlantic Records albums